Hemant Shesh (born 28 December 1952 ) is an Indian Hindi writer, poet and civil servant.

Biography 
Hemant Shesh completed his post graduate education in Sociology from the University of Rajasthan in Jaipur in 1977. He then joined the Rajasthan Administrative Service in the same year. He has worked on many senior positions in the Government including Dy. Secretary to His Excellency the Governor of Rajasthan, Secretary Rajasthan Public Service Commission, Secretary, Rajasthan Information Commission, and also as District collector and magistrate in Pratapgarh district of Rajasthan state. Hemant Shesh has retired from the Indian Administrative Service as Registrar for the Board of revenue in Ajmer, Rajasthan.

Writings and publications 
He has published over 31 books including 21 of his own writings while the rest were ones he edited. and has been editor for Kala-Prayojan a quarterly literary magazine. Among his published work are thirteen poetry collections. His poetry has also been translated into other languages, including non-Indian languages. Shesh has received many awards and honours

Major Books published 
Jaari Itihaas Ke Viruddha, 1974 (long poem)
Beswaad Hawayen, 1981 (monograph)
Kripal Singh Shekhawat, 1981 (monograph)
Ghar-Baahar, 1982 (poetry collection)
Neend men Mohenjodaro, 1988 (poetry collection)
Vrikshon Ke Swapna, 1988 (poetry collection)
Ashuddha Saarang, 1991 (poetry collection)
Kasht Ke Liye Kshamaa, 1995 (Poetry collection)
Kripayaa anyathaa Na Len, 1999 (Long poem)
Aap Ko yah Jaan Kar Prasanntaa Hogee, 2001 (poetry collection)
Jagah Jaasee Jagah, 2006 (poetry collection)
Bahut Kuchh Jaisaa Kuchh Naheen (poetry collection) 2007
Prapanch-Saar-Subodhnee (poetry collection) 2009
Khed-Yog-Pradeep (poetry collection) 2012
Raat Ka pahaad (short story collection) 2012
Pyashchitta Praveshika(poetry collection)2018
Afsos Darpan(poetry collection) 2019
Bhulne Kaa Vipaksh( Memoirs)2019
Chaar Sharanaame( History)2019
Iti Jaisa Shabd (poetry collection) 2019
 Na Hone Jisaa Honaa (poetry collection) 2019
 Gadya Ke Rang (Prose collection) 2021

Books in print 

Rajasthan Mein Aadhunik Kala (art-criticism)

Awards and honours 
Apart from many honours and public felicitations, he was awarded the K. K. Birla Foundation's Bihari Puraskar, a national award for the year 2009 for his collection of poetry titled Jagah Jaisi Jagah.
He has also been awarded by the Government of Rajasthan for 'original outstanding creative writing'. (1988)

See also
 List of Indian writers

Notes

References 

 
 
 

Indian civil servants
Hindi-language poets
1952 births
University of Rajasthan alumni
Poets from Rajasthan
Living people
Writers from Jaipur
Rajasthani people